Nicolas Vogel (born in Paris, France, May 27, 1925 - died in Paris September 17, 2006) was an actor and comedian who was featured in numerous films and television shows in the 1960s and 1970s, including The Man from Chicago (1963), Le Gitan (1975), Mado (1976), and Cop or Hood (1979). Vogel also held a small role in the 1995 film Les Misérables, directed by Claude Lelouch.

Partial filmography

Patrie (1946)
Pétrus (1946) - (uncredited)
Le Bataillon du ciel (1947) - Veran
Bethsabée (1947) - L'adjudant
Et dix de der (1948) - John Bradley 
Sous le ciel de Paris (1951) - Un gréviste
Wolves Hunt at Night (1952) - Jim - le chauffeur de Mollert
Seuls au monde (1952)
Le jugement de Dieu (1952)
La demoiselle et son revenant (1952)
La Jeune Folle (1952) - Tom
La Putain respectueuse (1952) - Un client du night-club
La môme vert-de-gris (1953) - Kerts
Jeunes mariés (1953) - Un Américain
The Women Couldn't Care Less (1954) - Jim Maloney
Sunday Encounter (1958) - Chartier, le dessinateur
Les liaisons dangereuses (1959) - Jerry Court
Les Affreux (1959)
Marche ou crève (1960) - Petit rôle (uncredited)
 Women Are Like That (1960) - Mayne
Amazons of Rome (1961) - Rasmal
Callaghan remet ça (1961)
 The Nina B. Affair (1961) - Von Knapp
Three Faces of Sin (1961) - Un invité au vernissage
Éducation sentimentale (1962)
Le Crime ne paie pas (1962) - Joseph Daime (segment "L'affaire Hugues")
Five Miles to Midnight (1962) - Eric Ostrum
The Man from Chicago (1963) - The Chief Inspector 
Sweet Skin (1963)
Brigade antigangs (1966) - Scrisky
The Night of the Generals (1967) - Plotting German Officer (uncredited)
I Killed Rasputin (1967) - Dr. Lazovert
La fille d'en face (1968)
Faut pas prendre les enfants du bon Dieu pour des canards sauvages (1968) - Le conseiller de Charles (uncredited)
Le petit matin (1971) - Un capitaine
César and Rosalie (1972) - Un joueur de poker (uncredited)
La Scoumoune (1972) - Grégoire
The Day of the Jackal (1973) - OAS Agent with Denise
Vincent, François, Paul and the Others (1974) - Clovis
Rosebud (1975) - Breton Commissioner
Le gitan (1975) - Jeannot
Mado (1976) - Maxime
Cop or Hood (1979) - Marcel Gaston
Une sale affaire (1981) - Alioti
Strange Affair (1981) - René
Waiter! (1983) - Maxime
Les Misérables (1995) - Le général de Verdun

References

1925 births
2006 deaths
French comedians
Male actors from Paris
20th-century French comedians